Kookaburras are birds native to Australia and New Guinea, of the genus Dacelo.

Kookaburra may also refer to:

Kookaburra (aircraft), an airplave involved in the death of Keith Anderson and Bobby Hitchcock
Kookaburras (hockey), an Australian national men's hockey team
"Kookaburra" (song), a popular children's song
Kookaburra (rocket), an Australian sounding rocket
Australian Silver Kookaburra, a silver bullion coin
Kookaburra Sport, a sports equipment company
"Kookaburra", a song by Cocteau Twins from the 1985 album Aikea-Guinea
 (A331), Royal Australian Navy
Dulmont Magnum, an Australian early laptop computer known as the Kookaburra
Schneider ES-52 Kookaburra, an Australian-designed and -built glider from the 1950s

See also
Kookooburra, a former Sydney Harbour ferry